Kitsuki Castle was a medieval Japanese castle in the town of Kitsuki, in Oita prefecture on the island of Kyushu.  The castle was restored during the late 20th century.

History
This castle was originally built by Kitsuki Yorinao in 1394, and situated so that it overlooks the Seto Inland Sea. Later, the castle came under control of Hosokawa Tadaoki in the 1600s. Matsudaira Hidechika eventually became lord of the castle, and the Matsudaira clan remained in charge of the caste until the Meiji Restoration in 1868. Like most castles, it was destroyed during the Meiji restoration period.

Present site 

A re-creation of the castle was built out of concrete in 1970. Efforts have been made to preserve the period aesthetics of the current site. In order to do so, modern intrusions have been avoided, so electric cables and
other modern intrusions have been kept out of sight. At present, the reconstructed castle is on site, and it includes a museum inside.
 The general area of Kitsuki has a great many historical samurai houses (bukeyashiki) and the area is visually in keeping with the historic nature of the castle.

Further reading

References 

Castles in Ōita Prefecture